In mathematics — specifically, in fractal geometry — the Assouad dimension is a definition of fractal dimension for subsets of a metric space.  It was introduced by Patrice Assouad in his 1977 PhD thesis and later published in 1979, although the same notion had been studied in 1928 by Georges Bouligand.  As well as being used to study fractals, the Assouad dimension has also been used to study quasiconformal mappings and embeddability problems.

Definition

the following bound holds:

The intuition underlying this definition is that, for a set  with "ordinary" integer dimension , the number of small balls of radius  needed to cover the intersection of a larger ball of radius  with  will scale like .

Relationships to other notions of dimension
 The Assouad dimension of a metric space is always greater than or equal to its Assouad–Nagata dimension.
 The Assouad dimension of a metric space is always greater than or equal to its upper box dimension, which in turn is greater than or equal to the Hausdorff dimension.
In particular, for every metrizable space there is a metric for which the Assouad dimension is equal to the Lebesgue covering dimension.

References

Further reading
 

Dimension theory
Fractals
Metric geometry